The following is a list of works submitted for certification to the British Board of Film Classification (BBFC), that were not immediately or, in some cases, ever granted a certificate.

Since its inception in 1912, it has been the BBFC's duty to classify films, television programmes, video games, advertisements and other visual media according to their content. If a work is deemed unacceptable by the BBFC according to their guidelines, they can choose to refuse a certificate to that work. Although these works can be shown in cinemas with the permission of local councils, they cannot legally be sold on home video. Online streaming platforms are not required to have their content certified by the BBFC, though many do.

Over the years, several works have been refused a certificate, effectively banning them. Some of these works were later classified uncut; some were cut to meet the BBFC's guidelines; and some have never been granted a certificate.

Works rejected, later classified uncut

Works rejected, later classified with cuts

Works rejected, have never been granted a certificate

See also
 British Board of Film Classification
 18 (British Board of Film Classification)
 Censorship in the United Kingdom
 History of British film certificates
 Irish Film Classification Office – the equivalent to the BBFC in the Republic of Ireland
 Motion picture content rating system
 Obscene Publications Act
 Press Complaints Commission
 Film censorship in the United Kingdom
 R18 certificate

Notes

Sources

Film censorship in the United Kingdom
Film controversies in the United Kingdom
United Kingdom
Banned
Films